Guarinus of Sitten (German: Warin) was Bishop of Sion.

Guarinus was born in Pont-à-Mousson, Lotharingia, around 1065, into a noble family. About 1085 he became a monk at the Benedictine monastery of Molesme Abbey. In 1094, together with a group of brothers, he founded a daughter house of Molesme, Aulps Abbey in Savoy. Guarinus became the second abbot. The abbey's name is derived from the Latin word alpibus, meaning "mountain pastures". Guarinus is a patron saint of cattle.

In 1138 Guarinus was appointed Bishop of Sion and later became revered as a saint. He died at Aulps Abbey in 1150.

Notes

French Roman Catholic saints
12th-century Christian saints
1150 deaths
French Benedictines
12th-century Roman Catholic bishops in the Holy Roman Empire
1060s births
People from Sion, Switzerland